Tyrosine-protein kinase, or Bromodomain adjacent to zinc finger domain, 1B (BAZ1B) is an enzyme that in humans is encoded by the BAZ1B gene.

Function 

This gene encodes a member of the bromodomain protein family. The bromodomain is a structural motif characteristic of proteins involved in chromatin-dependent regulation of transcription. This gene is deleted in Williams-Beuren syndrome, a developmental disorder caused by deletion of multiple genes at 7q11.23.

BAZ1B has been found to affect the activity of 448 other genes and is very important in the development of the neural crest and the face. Research suggests that changes in BAZ1B may have been involved in "self-domesticating" humans.

Animal models
Model organisms have been used in the study of BAZ1B function. A conditional knockout mouse line, called Baz1btm2a(KOMP)Wtsi, was generated as part of the International Knockout Mouse Consortium program — a high-throughput mutagenesis project to generate and distribute animal models of disease to interested scientists — at the Wellcome Trust Sanger Institute.

Male and female animals underwent a standardized phenotypic screen to determine the effects of deletion.

Six significant phenotypes were reported:

 Fewer homozygous mutant mice survived to weaning than expected.
 Mutant mice had decreased body weights compared to wildtype control mice.
 Mutant mice showed increased activity, VO2 and energy expenditure, determined by indirect calorimetry.
 Radiography found teeth abnormalities.
 Dual-energy X-ray absorptiometry (DEXA) showed mutant female mice had a decrease in bone mineral density and content.
 Male heterozygous mice had higher bacterial counts after Salmonella infection.

References

Further reading

External links 
 
 

Transcription factors